Bayliss is a surname. Notable people with the surname include:

 Adam Bayliss, film producer
 Alfred Bayliss, American educational administrator
 Brendan Bayliss, musician
 David Bayliss, footballer
 Edward Bayliss, cricketer
 George Bayliss, Australian Rules footballer
 John Bayliss, poet and editor
 Jonah Bayliss, baseball player
 Jonathan Bayliss, novelist and playwright
 Lisa Bayliss, field hockey player
 Mark Bayliss, Australian Rules footballer
 Mary Bayliss, English magistrate and Lord Lieutenant of the county of Berkshire
 Peter Bayliss, English actor
 Richard Bayliss, English medical doctor and Physician to the Queen
 Simon Bayliss, musician
 Trevor Bayliss, Australian cricketer
 Troy Bayliss, motorcycle racer
 William Bayliss, physiologist
 Wyke Bayliss, painter, author, and poet
 Bayliss Levrett, racing driver

Fictional characters 
 Jim/Sue Bayliss, in All My Sons
 Tim Bayliss, a fictional character in TV show Homicide: Life on the Street

See also
 Bayliss, California, unincorporated community in Glenn County
 Bayliss Avenue, football stadium in London
 Bayliss Effect, physiological process discovered by William Bayliss
Baylis (disambiguation)
Menahem Mendel Beilis

English-language surnames